Saint Dorotheus bishop of Tyre (present-day Lebanon; c. 255 – 362) is traditionally credited with an Acts of the Seventy Apostles (which may be the same work as the lost Gospel of the Seventy), who were sent out according to the Gospel of Luke 10:1.

Dorotheus was a learned priest of Antioch (Eusebius, VII.32) and a eunuch. Dorotheus is said to have been driven into exile during the persecution of Diocletian, but later returned. He attended the Council of Nicaea in 325, but was exiled to Odyssopolis (Varna) on the Black Sea in Thrace by Julian the Apostate. There, the 107-year-old priest was martyred for his faith. His feast day is observed June 5 according to the Gregorian calendar which coincides with June 18 on the Julian calendar.

See also 
 Pseudo-Dorotheus, works pseudepigraphically attributed to Dorotheus of Tyre
 4th century in Lebanon

References

External links
Henry Wace, Dictionary of Christian Biography and Literature to the End of the Sixth Century A.D. 
 The "Synopsis" of Dorotheus of Tyre, article by Roger Pearse

255 births
362 deaths
Lebanese saints
Syrian Christian saints
Saints from Roman Anatolia
4th-century Christian saints
Roman Thrace
People from Tyre, Lebanon
4th-century Syrian bishops
Lebanese centenarians
Men centenarians